This is a list of types of sandstone that have been or are used economically as natural stone for building and other commercial or artistic purposes.

Trans-regional 
(across state borders)
Cornbrash Sandstone: North Rhine-Westphalia, Lower Saxony
Elbe Sandstone: Germany (Saxony) and the Czech Republic
Red Main Sandstone: Hesse, Baden-Württemberg, Bavaria
Wealden Sandstone: Lower Saxony, North Rhine-Westphalia

Australia 

 Hawkesbury Sandstone: Sydney Basin,  Gosford

Belgium 
 Balegem Sandstone: Balegem in Oosterzele
 Ledian Sandstone: Lede
 Gobertange Sandstone: Gobertange in Jodoigne

Canada
 Nepean Sandstone: Ottawa, Ontario
 Paskapoo Sandstone: Calgary, Alberta

Czech Republic 
 Božanov Sandstone: near Božanov
 Niedergrund Sandstone: near Dolní Žleb
 Libná Sandstone: near Libná
 Zdoňov Sandstone: near Zdoňov
 Mšené Sandstone; near Mšené-lázně
 Podhorní Sandstone: near Podhorní Újezd
 Těšínský Sandstone: near Řeka

Denmark 
 Nexø Sandstone (also Neksö Sandstone): near Nexø on Bornholm

Estonia 
 Devonian Sandstone at Suur Taevaskoda, Põlva County

France 
 Avessac: near Redon
 Belleau: near Château-Thierry
 Bigarré des Vosges: in the Vosges
 Blavozy: near Puy-en-Velay
 Champenay: near Saint-Dié
 Erquy: near Saint-Brieuc
 Fontainebleau: near Fontainebleau
 Frain: in the Vosges
 La Rhune: near Bayonne
 : near Rodez
 Najac: near Villefranche-de-Rouergue
 Omonville: near Omonville-la-Rogue
 Rothbach: in the Vosges

Germany

Bavaria 

Abtswind Sandstone: on the Friedrichsberg near Abtswind
Burgpreppach Sandstone: Burgpreppach
Gnodstadt Sandstone: Gnodstadt near Ochsenfurt
Ihrlerstein Green Sandstone: Ihrlerstein near Kelheim
Sand Sandstone: Sand am Main
Trebgast Sandstone: Trebgast
Worzeldorf Sandstone: Worzeldorf near Nuremberg

Baden-Württemberg 
Dettenhausen Sandstone: was formerly quarried in the Schönbuch
Donzdorf Sandstone: near Donzdorf
Freudenstädt Sandstone: near Freudenstadt
Heilbronn Sandstone: near Heilbronn
Lossburg Sandstone: Lossburg
Maulbronn Sandstone: near Maulbronn
Nöttingen Sandstone: near Nöttingen
Neckar Valley Sandstone: Mosbach near Heidelberg
Pfrondorf Sandstone: Pfrondorf
Pliezhausen Sandstone: near Pliezhausen
Weil Sandstone: Weiler near Sinsheim

Hessen 
Cornberg Sandstone: near Cornberg
Friedewald Sandstone: near Friedewald
Odenwald Sandstone: near Beerfelden

Lower Saxony 
Bentheim and Gildehaus Sandstone: Bad Bentheim
Deister Sandstone: Völksen
Hils Sandstone: Lutter am Barenberge
Nesselberg Sandstone: Altenhagen I
Obernkirchen Sandstone: Obernkirchen
Osterwald Sandstone: Osterwald
Piesberg Sandstone: Osnabrück
Süntel Sandstone: Pötzen
Velpk Sandstone: Velpke
Weser Sandstone: Bad Karlshafen and Arholzen

North Rhine –Westphalia 

Anröchte Stone: Anröchte
Baumberge Sandstone: Baumberge
Ibbenbüren Sandstone: Ibbenbüren
Liedberg Sandstone: Liedberg
Osning Sandstone: Teutoburg Forest
Porta Sandstone: Porta Westfalica
Planicosta Sandstone: Lemgo
Rüthen Sandstone: Rüthen in the Sauerland
Ruhr Sandstone: Ruhrtal from Fröndenberg to Mülheim
Teutoburg Forest Sandstone: Teutoburg Forest
Werl Green Sandstone: Werl

Rheinland-Pfalz 
Kordel Sandstone Kordel
Leistadt Sandstone: Leistadt
Neustadt-Haardt Sandstone: Neustadt an der Weinstraße
Schweinstal Sandstone: Schopp
Udelfangen Sandstone: Udelfangen
Flonheim Sandstone: Flonheim
Obersulzbach Sandstone: Obersulzbach

Saarland 
Britten Sandstone: near Britten

Saxony 

Elbe sandstones:
Cotta Sandstone: Cotta near Pirna
Grillenburg Sandstone: Grillenburg in the Tharandt Forest
Niederschöna Sandstone: Niederschöna near Freiberg by the Tharandt Forest
Posta Sandstone: Lohmen near Pirna
Reinhardtsdorf Sandstone: Reinhardtsdorf-Schöna near Pirna
Wehlen Sandstone: Stadt Wehlen near Pirna

Saxony-Anhalt 
Nebra Sandstone: Nebra
Siebigerode Sandstone: Siebigerode
Ummendorf Sandstone: Ummendorf

Thuringia 
Fambach Sandstone: near Schmalkalden
Nebra Sandstone: Nebra
Seeberg Sandstone: Seeberg near Gotha
Tambach Sandstone: near Tambach-Dietharz
Themar Sandstone: Themar

Hungary
Hárshegy Sandstone Formation: near Budapest

India
Chunar stone: near Chunar
Pink Sandstone: from Rajasathan
Jodhpur Sandstone
Kandla Grey Sandstone: Bijoliya, Rajasthan.

Israel/Palestine
 Kurkar

Italy 
Pietra di Gorgoglione: near Matera
Pietra Dorata: near Manciano
Santafiora: Grosseto

Lesotho 
White City Sandstone, near Maseru

Pakistan 

 Khewra Sandstone: from Khewra Salt Mine, Punjab
 Yellow Sandstone: near Jhimpir, Karachi, Sindh
 Mango Sandstone: from Balochistan
 Teak Wood Sandstone: near Karachi, Sindh
 Buff/Grey Sandstone
 Sunset Sung Sandstone
 Imperial Red Sandstone

Poland 
Silesian Sandstone, in Lower Silesia

Spain 
 Ronda Sandstone: Ronda,  Málaga
Villamayor Sandstone: Villamayor, Salamanca

Sweden
 Burgsvik sandstone
 Gotland sandstone

Switzerland 
Bäch Sandstone: by the Lake Zürich
Bern Sandstone: quarry sites near Bern in Ostermundigen, Krauchthal and by the Gurten
Bollingen Sandstone (also Buchberg Sandstone, Uznaberg Sandstone, Bollinger-Lehholz Sandstone and Güntliweid Sandstone): Rapperswil-Jona by the Upper Lake Zürich
Grès à cailloux roulés: near Avenches
Grès de Attalens: near Vevey
Grès de Bulle: near Echarlens
Grès de Corbières: near Echarlens
Grès de Vaulruz: near Vaulruz
Rorschach Sandstone: Rorschach
St. Margreth Sandstone: St. Margrethen
Teufen Sandstone: near Teufen

South Africa 
 
 Ermelo Sandstone, Mpumalanga province, near der Farm de Roodepoort
 Matatiele Sandstone, KwaZulu-Natal province, near Matatiele
 Naboomspruit (also Golden Dawn or Golden Stone) Limpopo province, around Warmbaths
 Nieuwoudtville Sandstone, Northern Cape province, near Nieuwoudtville
 Oudtshoorn Sandstone, Western Cape province, near Oudtshoorn
 Sandalwood (also Picturestone), Northern Cape province, near Vioolsdrif
 Steenpan (also Flatpan or Klippan), Free State province, near Wolvehoek
 Table Mountain Sandstone Western Cape province, various quarry sites
 numerous types, some without trade names, from the Karoo Supergroup in many quarries near Graaff-Reinet, Cradock, Queenstown, Aliwal North, Burgersdorp and Sterkstroom

United Kingdom
 Old Red Sandstone
 New Red Sandstone
 Locharbriggs Sandstone
 Craigleith Sandstone

England
 Bargate stone: from Surrey
 Horsham Stone: from Sussex
 Millstone Grit: from Northern England
 Yorkstone: from Yorkshire

Wales
 Pennant stone: from South Wales and Bristol area

United States

 Aquia Creek Sandstone: in Virginia
 Bayfield group: in northern Wisconsin
 Coconino Sandstone: in the Colorado Plateau
 Crab Orchard Sandstone: Cumberland Plateau, Tennessee
 Cutler Formation: in the Colorado Plateau
 Dakota Sandstone: in the Rocky Mountains and Great Plains
 Entrada Sandstone: in the Colorado Plateau
 Freda sandstone: in northern Michigan
 Guyandotte sandstone: in West Virginia
 Jacobsville sandstone: in northern Michigan
 Jordan Formation in the upper Midwest
 Medina sandstone extensive quarries in Western New York Monument Valley: Utah-Arizona state line
 Navajo Sandstone: in the Colorado Plateau
 Ohio Sandstone: 
 Berea Grit in Northeast Ohio, originally used for grindstones, later used to build the Federal Reserve Bank of New York
 Ohio bluestone, also found in Northeast Ohio in certain streambeds and used as dimension stone
 Pennsylvania Bluestone in northeast Pennsylvania and adjoining parts of New Jersey and New York
 Stockton Sandstone: in western New Jersey along the Delaware River
 Potsdam Sandstone: in upstate New York
 Tapeats Sandstone: in Arizona (famously found in the Grand Canyon)
 Wingate Sandstone: in the Colorado Plateau
 Aqua Creek Sandstone'': used to build the Whitehouse

See also

List of decorative stones
List of types of limestone
List of types of marble

References

Sandstone
Sandstone
.Sandstone
Sandstone
Sandstone